The Gò Công River is a river of Vietnam. It flows through Tiền Giang Province for 12 kilometres.

Rivers of Tiền Giang province
Rivers of Vietnam